Chersky Peak is a mountain in the Komarinsky Range, Khamar-Daban, Russian Federation. 

This peak is named after Polish explorer Jan Czerski (1845 - 1892), who greatly contributed to the study of neighboring Lake Baikal.

Geography
This  2,090 m high peak is one of the highest points of the Khamar-Daban Range, part of the South Siberian System of ranges. It rises in the Komarinsky subrange of the Khamar-Daban. Administratively the Chersky Peak is part of the Slyudyansky District, at the southern end of Irkutsk Oblast. Lake Serdtse is located below the southern slopes of the mountain.

See also
List of mountains and hills of Russia

References

External links

Landforms of Irkutsk Oblast